Kajara was one of the six independent kingdoms which was established after the fall of the Kingdom of Mpororo in 1752. It was ruled by an Omukama. It became a part of the Kingdom of Ankole in 1901.

See also
Igara
Nshenyi
Obwera
Rujumbura
Rukiga

References

World Statesmen.org

Ankole